Sorin Ilfoveanu (born May 23, 1946, in Câmpulung Muscel) is a Romanian painter, designer and university teacher.

Formation
 1953-1964 attends the classes of the Ion Brătianu High School in Pitești, where he was colleague, among others, with Daniel Turcea.
 1964-1970 attends the courses of the Bucharest National University of Arts, in the class of master Corneliu Baba, assistant Liviu Lăzărescu, having as colleagues, among others, Mihai Cismaru, Ștefan Câlția, Sorin Dumitrescu, and teachers: Eugen Schileru in art history, Gheorghe Ghițescu in anatomy and Simion Iuca in engraving.
 1971- he has been a member of the Fine Arts Artists Union of Romania.

University Activity
1992-1996 he is the head of the painting department at Bucharest National University of Arts.
1996-2000 he is the Dean of the Faculty of Fine Arts from the Bucharest National University of Arts.
2004-2006 he is Rector of the Bucharest National University of Arts.

Personal exhibitions
2011 "Drawings 2008 - 2011", AnnArt Gallery, Bucharest
2011 Ilfoveanu Painting, Sala Dalles, Bucharest
2002 Codex Ilfoveanu, Apollo gallery, deINTERESE gallery and U.A.P., Bucharest / Romania
2002 Brukenthal Museum, Sibiu / Romania
2002 Art Museum, Cluj-Napoca / Romania
2001 National Museum of Art, Bucharest / Romania
2001 M.M.G. gallery, Tokyo
1999 Maculata Conceptie/Maculata Conception, with Ştefan Agapian and Adrian Ilfoveanu, Romanian Museum of Literature, Bucharest / Romania
1994 Romanian Cultural Centre from Vienna / Austria
1993 Artexpo gallery, National Theatre, Bucharest / Romania
1988 French Institute, Bucharest / Romania
1987 Marais gallery, Paris / France
1985 National Museum of Art, Bucharest / Romania
1975 Art Museum, Cluj Napoca / Romania
1968 Art Museum, Pitesti / Romania

Group exhibitions

2009 Saga Ilfoveanu, (Sorin, Ana-Ruxandra, Adrian, Nicu Ilfoveanu), ArtSociety Gallery, Bucharest
2009 Mitologie Soggettive, Rocca Paulina, Perugia, Italia;
2010 ZOOMANIA.RO, National Museum of Contemporary Art, Bucharest;
2002 Littman & White Gallery, Portland, United States
2000 Jungersted & Brostrom Gallery, Copenhaga
1997 Tegnerfobundet Hall, Oslo / Norway
1997 Abu-Dhabi Cultural Foundation, Arab Emirates Unite
1997 Art Museum from Sharjah, Arab Emirates Unite
1998 Transfiguratii, Mucsarnok / Budapest
1995 Art museum from Gotteborg / Sweden
1988 Art Museum from Seoul, South Korean
1988 Volda Gallery, Norway
1989 Arnhem Gallery, Holland
1987 Orizont Gallery, Bucharest / Romania
1986 Cagnes-sur-Mer International Festival, France
1984 I.M.S. Gallery, Oslo / Norway
1982 Valparaiso Biennial, Chile
1978 International Art Biennial, Venice / Italy
1977 Voos-Bergen, Norway
1969 Astra Gallery Bucharest

Notes

Bibliography
 Exhibition Catalogue Sorin Ilfoveanu "Drawings 2008 - 2011", AnnArt Gallery, Bucharest;
„Sorin Ilfoveanu Atelier 1995-2010” Editura UNARTE și Asociația pentru Artă Ilfoveanu, 2011/"Sorin Ilfoveanu 1995-2010 Workshop" Printing House for the Arts Ilfoveanu UNARTE Association, 2011;
 Grife/Bark/Blazer/Ilfoveanu, Ed. Victor B. Victor 2002
Artists workshops in Bucharest, Sofin Ilfoveanu, metaphysical interrogations of artist Victor Neumann, page 65 Noimediaprint Ed 2008/ Ateliere de artisti din București, Sofin Ilfoveanu, Interogațiile metafizice ale artistului de Victor Neumann, pagina 65 Ed. Noimediaprint 2008
Sorin Ilfoveanu, Drawings (1994–2007), published by the Association for Art Ilfoveanu, preface of the book-presentation by Cristian Robert Velescu, 2008/ Sorin Ilfoveanu, Desene (1994–2007), Editată de Asociația pentru Artă Ilfoveanu, prefață-prezentare a cărții de Cristian Robert Velescu, 2008
 Exhibition Catalogue Ilfoveanu Saga, ArtSociety Gallery, Bucharest, 2009/Catalogul Expoziției Saga Ilfoveanu, Galeria ArtSociety, București, 2009
 Exhibition Catalogue Umbria: Terra d'incontri - Mitologie Soggettive, Rocca Paulina Perugia, Sorin Ilfoveanu, 2009
 Barbosa, Octavian, Dicționarul artiștilor români contemporani, Editura Meridiane, București, 1976, p. 241-242
 Sorin Ilfoveanu. Colors and metaphors, Meridians House Bucharest, 1983/Sorin Ilfoveanu. Culori și metafore, Editura Meridiane București, 1983
Catalogul Expoziției Ilfoveanu, Pictură și Desen, Muzeul Național de Artă, București, 1985/Ilfoveanu exhibition catalog, Painting and Drawing, National Art Museum, Bucharest, 1985
Sorin Ilfoveanu, Dicționar de arta modernă și contemporană, Constantin Prut, Ed. Univers enciclopedic 2002
Sorin Ilfoveanu, Albumul, L'art Roumain, Répères Contemporains, p. 20, auteur Constantin Prut, Ed. Union des Peintres de la Roumanie, 1995
Sorin Ilfoveanu, Exhibition Catalog of Maculata Conception, Museum of Romanian Literature, Bucharest 1999.

External links
https://web.archive.org/web/20120425082905/http://www.iasi24info.ro/stire_2533_sorin-ilfoveanu-si-mihai-ritivoiu-castigatorii-premiilor-prometheus.html
http://romania-on-line.net/whoswho/IlfoveanuSorin.htm
Sorin Ilfoveanu artist website- http://www.ilfoveanu.ro/

1946 births
Living people
Academic staff of the Bucharest National University of Arts
Romanian painters
Rectors of universities in Romania